Black Robe is a 1991 historical drama film directed by Bruce Beresford, adapted by Brian Moore from his 1985 novel of the same name. Set in the 17th century, it depicts the adventures of a Jesuit missionary tasked with founding a mission in New France. To do so, he must traverse 1500 miles of harsh wilderness with the help of a group of Algonquins, facing danger from both the unfamiliar environment and rival tribes. The title refers to the nickname given to the Jesuits by the Algonquins, referring to his black cassock.

The film stars Lothaire Bluteau in the title role, with other cast members including Aden Young, Sandrine Holt, Tantoo Cardinal, August Schellenberg, Gordon Tootoosis and Raoul Trujillo. It was the first official co-production between a Canadian film team and an Australian one. It was shot mostly in the Canadian province of Quebec. It was Young and Holt's film debut.

Black Robe premiered at the 1991 Toronto International Film Festival and was given a wide release on 6 October, becoming the highest-grossing Canadian film of 1991. It received generally positive reviews and won several accolades. It was nominated for ten Genie Awards and won six, including Best Motion Picture, Best Director (Beresford), Best Adapted Screenplay (Moore), and Best Supporting Actor (Schellenberg). It was also nominated for ten AACTA Awards, with Peter James winning Best Cinematography.

Plot
Set in New France in 1634 (in the period of conflicts known as the Beaver Wars), the film begins in the settlement that will one day become Quebec City. Jesuit missionaries are trying to encourage the local Algonquin Indians to embrace Christianity, with thus far only limited results. Samuel de Champlain, founder of the settlement, sends Father LaForgue, a young Jesuit priest, to found a Catholic mission in a distant Huron village. With winter approaching, the journey will be difficult and cover as much as 1500 miles (2414 kilometers).

LaForgue is accompanied on his journey by a non-Jesuit assistant, Daniel, and a group of Algonquin Indians whom Champlain has charged with guiding him to the Huron village. This group includes Chomina – an older, experienced traveller who has clairvoyant dreams; his wife; and Annuka, their daughter. As they journey across the lakes and forests, Daniel and Annuka fall in love, to the discomfort of the celibate LaForgue.

The group meet with a band of Montagnais, First Nations people who have never met Frenchmen before. The Montagnais shaman, Mestigoit, is suspicious (and implicitly jealous) of LaForgue's influence over the Algonquins. He accuses him of being a demon. He encourages Chomina and the other Algonquins to abandon the two Frenchmen and travel instead to a winter hunting lodge. This they do, paddling away from the Frenchmen. LaForgue accepts his fate, but Daniel is determined to stay with Annuka and follows the Indians as they march across the forest. When one Indian tries to shoot Daniel, Chomina is consumed by guilt at having betrayed Champlain's trust. He and a few other members of the Algonquin tribe return with Daniel to try to find LaForgue.

As they recover LaForgue, a party of Mohawk Iroquois attack them, killing most of the Algonquin, amongst them Chomina's wife, and taking the rest captive. They are taken to an Iroquois fortress, where they are forced to run the gauntlet, watch Chomina's young son be killed, and are told they will be slowly tortured to death the next day. That night Annuka seduces their guard, allowing him to engage in coitus with her. When this distracts him she strikes him with a caribou hoof, rendering him unconscious and allowing them to escape. Chomina, dying of a wound from his capture, sees a small grove he has dreamed of many times before, and realizes it is the place he is destined to die. LaForgue tries, unsuccessfully, to persuade Chomina to embrace Christ before he dies. As Chomina freezes to death in the snow, he sees the She-Manitou appearing to him.

As the weather grows colder, Annuka and Daniel take LaForgue to the outskirts of the Huron settlement, but leave him to enter it alone, because Chomina had dreamed that this must happen. LaForgue finds all but one of the French inhabitants dead, murdered by the Hurons who blamed them for a smallpox epidemic. The leader of the last survivors tells LaForgue that the Hurons are dying, and he should offer to save them by baptizing them. LaForgue confronts the Hurons.

When their leader asks LaForgue if he loves them, LaForgue thinks of the faces of all the Indians he has met on his journey, and answers "Yes".  The leader then asks him to baptize them, and the Hurons receive his baptism. The film ends with a golden sunrise. An intertitle states that fifteen years later, the Hurons, having accepted Christianity, were routed and killed by their enemies the Iroquois; the Jesuit mission to the Hurons was abandoned and the Jesuits returned to Quebec.

Cast

Production
Bruce Beresford had wanted to make a film out of Brian Moore's novel ever since it was first published. The rights had been acquired by Canada's Alliance Films, which had signed another director. That person fell out, as did another director, before the job was given to Beresford. Beresford stated:
I think that, even if you have no religious faith whatever or, even if you despised the Jesuits, you would still find it an interesting story. It's a wonderful study of obsession and love. And it is a wonderful adventure of the spirit and of the body. What those people did, going to a country where winters were far more severe than anything they had known in Europe, meeting people who were far more fierce than anyone they had ever encountered... Having to deal with these people shows us something of humanity at its greatest. It's the equivalent of today's people getting into space shuttles and going off into space. It takes unbelievable courage to do this.
The film remained in development hell for over four years due to no major American studio willing to finance the project. Beresford was only able to convince Alliance Films to hire him after his previous film, Driving Miss Daisy, won the Academy Award for Best Picture. The success of Dances with Wolves, a film with similar themes released the prior year, also convinced Alliance of the project's viability.

Funds were raised under a co-production treaty between Canada and Australia. The production needed 30% Australian financing, and the Film Finance Corporation investment had to be spent on Australian elements, such as an Australian crew and two Australian actors.

The film was shot primarily on-location in Quebec, in the Saguenay–Lac-Saint-Jean region. Additional scenes were shot in Rouen in northern France. The entire film was shot in-sequence.

Release
Black Robe opened in Canada on 4 October 1991 and then had a exclusive opening in New York, Los Angeles and Chicago on 1 November 1991 before expanding on 22 November to a further 222 theaters.

Reception
Black Robe was praised as a "magnificently staged combination of top talents delivering a gripping and tragic story", and has been rated one of the most meticulously researched representations of indigenous life put on film. Notably, the film includes dialogue in the Cree, Mohawk, and Algonquin languages.  The French characters speak English in the film.  Latin is used for Catholic prayers.

Political activist Ward Churchill, after highly praising the film-making, criticized historical inaccuracies. He said he thought the film vilified the Mohawks as part of a theme that Indian resistance to European culture was evil.

Box office
Black Robe grossed $1.1 million in Canada in its first four weeks before opening in the United States. Expanding to 55 screens it grossed $179,467 for the weekend of 3 November 1991. It expanded on the weekend of 22 November to 282 screens, grossing $882,300 for the weekend, finishing 11th in the United States and Canada for the weekend. In Canada, it won the Golden Reel Award, indicating the highest box-office performance of any Canadian film that year. In English Canada, it was among only three Canadian films to gross over $500,000 between 1987 and 1990, along with Jesus of Montreal and Dead Ringers.
Black Robe grossed $2,036,056 at the box office in Australia, the third highest-grossing Australian film of the year behind Strictly Ballroom and Romper Stomper.

Awards and nominations

Genie Award

AACTA Award

Other awards

See also
Jesuit Missions amongst the Huron
Innu people

References

External links
 
Black Robe, Canadian Film Encyclopedia
 Black Robe details National Film and Sound Archive
Black Robe at Oz movies

Canadian epic films
1991 films
1991 drama films
1991 independent films
1990s historical drama films
Algonquin-language films
Alliance Atlantis films
Australian adventure drama films
Australian historical drama films
Australian independent films
Best Picture Genie and Canadian Screen Award winners
Canadian adventure drama films
Canadian historical drama films
Canadian independent films
Canadian survival films
Cree-language films
English-language Canadian films
Latin-language films
Mohawk-language films
Films about Catholic priests
Films based on Canadian novels
Films based on historical novels
Films based on novels by Brian Moore
Films directed by Bruce Beresford
Films scored by Georges Delerue
Films set in the 1630s
Films set in Ontario
Films set in Quebec
First Nations films
Saguenay–Lac-Saint-Jean in fiction
Works by Brian Moore (novelist)
1990s Canadian films